Kafir-kala ("Fortress of the infidels") is an ancient fortress in the Vakhsh valley in Tajikistan.

Fortress and Buddhist temple
It consists in a rectangular town surrounded by a wall with towers (360x360 meters), surrounded by a large ditch, and has one citadel (360x360 meters) in one corner, also surrounded by a wall. The citadel (70x70 meters) contained the palace of the rulers.

A Buddhist temple was found in the palace complex of the fortress as well as a Buddhist Vihara with Buddhist paintings, belonging to the "Tokharistan school of art". Inscriptions with apparently Buddhist content have also been found.

Artefacts

Sources

References

Populated places along the Silk Road
Cities in Central Asia
Archaeological sites in Tajikistan
Sogdian cities